Tony "Bad Boy" Badea (born 2 May 1974) is a Romanian Canadian retired professional boxer.

Career
Badea competed as welterweight, light middleweight, middleweight and super middleweight between the 1990s and 2000s.

Personal life
Badea was born in Romania and immigrated to Edmonton, Alberta, when he was 16 years old. He is the son of Virgil Badea who was the light middleweight boxing Champion of Romania in 1961.

From 2002 until 2007, his career was interrupted because of his problems with alcoholism and drug use. In December 2007 he was found by a biker in a ditch, covered in snow, the biker announced the Gendarmery. The Gendarmery officer took Tony in the shelter for the poor across the road. Badea worked at the shelter's kitchen and followed a rehabilitation program. 

After he ended his career with three last fights in 2008, he worked in a bakery where he met his wife Jody who gave birth to his daughter, Olivia.

Championships and accomplishments
Canadian Boxing Federation
CBF Super Welterweight Championship (One time)

Commonwealth Boxing Council
Commonwealth Super Welterweight Championship (One time)

International Boxing Organization
IBO Inter-Continental Super Welterweight Championship (One time)

Professional boxing record

{|class="wikitable" style="text-align:center; font-size:95%"
|-
!
!Result
!Record
!Opponent
!Method
!Round, time
!Date
!Location
!Notes
|-
|36
|Loss
|27–7–1 (1)
|style="text-align:left;"| Kris Andrews
|TKO
|1 (6), 1:59
|June 20, 2008
|style="text-align:left;"| 
|style="text-align:left;"|
|-
|35
|Win
|27–6–1 (1)
|style="text-align:left;"| Claudio Ortiz
|DQ
|5 (6), 2:05
|May 16, 2008
|style="text-align:left;"| 
|style="text-align:left;"|
|-
|34
|Win
|26–6–1 (1)
|style="text-align:left;"| Justin Berger
|TKO
|2 (6), 1:15
|Mar 28, 2008
|style="text-align:left;"| 
|style="text-align:left;"|
|-
|33
|Loss
|25–6–1 (1)
|style="text-align:left;"| Verno Phillips
|TKO
|4 (10), 3:00
|July 19, 2002
|style="text-align:left;"| 
|style="text-align:left;"|
|-
|32
|Loss
|25–5–1 (1)
|style="text-align:left;"| Darrell Woods
|TKO
|7 (10), 2:29
|May 31, 2002
|style="text-align:left;"| 
|style="text-align:left;"|
|-
|31
|Win
|25–4–1 (1)
|style="text-align:left;"| Wayne Harris
|UD
|8
|Sep 20, 2001
|style="text-align:left;"| 
|style="text-align:left;"|
|-
|30
|Loss
|24–4–1 (1)
|style="text-align:left;"| Richard Williams
|TKO
|3 (12), 0:47
|Jan 23, 2001
|style="text-align:left;"| 
|style="text-align:left;"|
|-
|29
|Win
|24–3–1 (1)
|style="text-align:left;"| Gilberto Flores
|UD
|10
|Nov 17, 2000
|style="text-align:left;"| 
|style="text-align:left;"|
|-
|28
|Loss
|23–3–1 (1)
|style="text-align:left;"| Juan Carlos Candelo
|UD
|10
|June 9, 2000
|style="text-align:left;"| 
|style="text-align:left;"|
|-
|27
|Win
|23–2–1 (1)
|style="text-align:left;"| Paulo Alejandro Sanchez
|SD
|10
|April 6, 2000
|style="text-align:left;"| 
|style="text-align:left;"|
|-
|26
|Win
|22–2–1 (1)
|style="text-align:left;"| Gavin Topp
|UD
|12
|Nov 19, 1999
|style="text-align:left;"| 
|style="text-align:left;"|
|-
|25
|Win
|21–2–1 (1)
|style="text-align:left;"| Mario L'Esperance
|TKO
|6 (8)
|Aug 12, 1999
|style="text-align:left;"| 
|style="text-align:left;"|
|-
|24
|Win
|20–2–1 (1)
|style="text-align:left;"| Manny Sobral
|KO
|6 (12)
|June 24, 1999
|style="text-align:left;"| 
|style="text-align:left;"|
|-
|23
|Win
|19–2–1 (1)
|style="text-align:left;"| Greg Johnson
|RTD
|5 (12), 3:00
|Feb 23, 1999
|style="text-align:left;"| 
|style="text-align:left;"|
|-
|22
|Win
|18–2–1 (1)
|style="text-align:left;"| Aaron McLaurine
|UD
|10
|April 21, 1998
|style="text-align:left;"| 
|style="text-align:left;"|
|-
|21
|Win
|17–2–1 (1)
|style="text-align:left;"| Greg Johnson
|TKO
|3
|Feb 13, 1998
|style="text-align:left;"| 
|style="text-align:left;"|
|-
|20
|Loss
|16–2–1 (1)
|style="text-align:left;"| Manny Sobral
|TD
|11 (12)
|June 12, 1997
|style="text-align:left;"| 
|style="text-align:left;"|
|-
|19
|Win
|16–1–1 (1)
|style="text-align:left;"| Anthony Ivory
|UD
|12
|Mar 27, 1997
|style="text-align:left;"| 
|style="text-align:left;"|
|-
|18
|Win
|15–1–1 (1)
|style="text-align:left;"| James Stokes
|TKO
|2 (8), 1:48
|Feb 13, 1997
|style="text-align:left;"| 
|style="text-align:left;"|
|-
|17
|Win
|14–1–1 (1)
|style="text-align:left;"| Jeff Johnson
|UD
|8
|Dec 15, 1996
|style="text-align:left;"| 
|style="text-align:left;"|
|-
|16
|Win
|13–1–1 (1)
|style="text-align:left;"| Derrick Coleman
|TKO
|10
|Oct 7, 1996
|style="text-align:left;"| 
|style="text-align:left;"|
|-
|15
|Draw
|12–1–1 (1)
|style="text-align:left;"| Derrick Coleman
|PTS
|8
|Aug 29, 1996
|style="text-align:left;"| 
|style="text-align:left;"|
|-
|14
|Loss
|12–1 (1)
|style="text-align:left;"| Fitz Vanderpool
|TKO
|6 (12)
|April 19, 1996
|style="text-align:left;"| 
|style="text-align:left;"|
|-
|13
|Win
|12–0 (1)
|style="text-align:left;"| Bryon Mackie
|UD
|10
|Jan 25, 1996
|style="text-align:left;"| 
|style="text-align:left;"|
|-
|12
|Win
|11–0 (1)
|style="text-align:left;"| Phil Clarson
|TKO
|3
|Dec 7, 1995
|style="text-align:left;"| 
|style="text-align:left;"|
|-
|11
|Win
|10–0 (1)
|style="text-align:left;"| Dezi Ford
|UD
|10
|Oct 25, 1995
|style="text-align:left;"| 
|style="text-align:left;"|
|-
|10
|Win
|9–0 (1)
|style="text-align:left;"| Alan Harper
|TKO
|9 (10), 1:22
|Aug 14, 1995
|style="text-align:left;"| 
|style="text-align:left;"|
|-
|9
|Win
|8–0 (1)
|style="text-align:left;"| Darrell Cottrell
|TKO
|6 (10), 1:36
|June 27, 1995
|style="text-align:left;"| 
|style="text-align:left;"|
|-
|8
|Win
|7–0 (1)
|style="text-align:left;"| Ron Pasek
|UD
|6
|April 28, 1995
|style="text-align:left;"| 
|style="text-align:left;"|
|-
|7
|style="background:#DDD"|
|6–0 (1)
|style="text-align:left;"| Tracy Anderson
|ND
|2
|Mar 31, 1995
|style="text-align:left;"| 
|style="text-align:left;"|
|-
|6
|Win
|6–0
|style="text-align:left;"| Brian Ramsden
|TKO
|2 (6)
|Feb 24, 1995
|style="text-align:left;"| 
|style="text-align:left;"|
|-
|5
|Win
|5–0
|style="text-align:left;"| Chris Coleman
|TKO
|5 (6)
|Jan 26, 1995
|style="text-align:left;"| 
|style="text-align:left;"|
|-
|4
|Win
|4–0
|style="text-align:left;"| Rob Stowell
|TKO
|3 (6)
|Dec 9, 1994
|style="text-align:left;"| 
|style="text-align:left;"|
|-
|3
|Win
|3–0
|style="text-align:left;"| Terry Fowler
|TKO
|4 (6), 1:19
|Oct 21, 1994
|style="text-align:left;"| 
|style="text-align:left;"|
|-
|2
|Win
|2–0
|style="text-align:left;"| Darren Kenny
|KO
|3 (6)
|Sep 15, 1994
|style="text-align:left;"| 
|style="text-align:left;"|
|-
|1
|Win
|1–0
|style="text-align:left;"| Mike Kennedy
|TKO
|4 (6)
|Mar 22, 1994
|style="text-align:left;"| 
|style="text-align:left;"|

References

External links

1974 births
Canadian male boxers
Light-middleweight boxers
Middleweight boxers
Commonwealth Boxing Council champions
Place of birth missing (living people)
Sportspeople from Edmonton
Romanian emigrants to Canada
Super-middleweight boxers
Welterweight boxers
Living people
Romanian male boxers